The Catholic University of America Press, also known as CUA Press, is the publishing division of The Catholic University of America. Founded on November 14, 1939, and incorporated on July 16, 1941, the CUA Press is a long-time member of the Association of University Presses. Its editorial offices are located on the campus of the Catholic University of America in Washington, D.C. The Press has over 1,000 titles in print and currently publishes 40 new titles annually, with particular emphasis on theology, philosophy, ecclesiastical history, medieval studies, and canon law. CUA Press distributes books on behalf of Sapientia Press of Ave Maria University, books of the Franciscan University of Steubenville Press, Humanum Academic Press of the John Paul II Institute, and for the Academy of American Franciscan History. CUA Press also publishes books under its Catholic Education Press imprint.

Notable titles

 A Primer of Ecclesiastical Latin by John Collins
 Eschatology: Death and Eternal Life by Joseph Cardinal Ratzinger (Pope Benedict XVI) 
 The Intellectual Life by A.G. Sertillanges, O.P.;
 Ethica Thomistica by Ralph McInerny;
 The Sources of Christian Ethics by Servais-Theodore Pinckaers, O.P.;
 The Treatise on Laws by Gratian;
 The Mind That is Catholic by James V. Schall SJ;
 The God of Faith and Reason by Robert Sokolowski;
 Saint Thomas Aquinas by Jean Pierre Torrell, O.P.;
 Some Seed Fell on Good Ground by Cardinal Timothy Michael Dolan;
 A Godly Humanism, by Cardinal Francis George, OMI;  
 Ossa Latinitatis by Reginald Foster, O.C.D., formerly of the Latin Letters Office, and Daniel McCarthy;
 The Church in Iraq by Cardinal Fernando Filoni;
 The Black Catholic Studies Reader edited by David Endres;
 Understanding the Diaconate by Shawn McKnight, bishop of the Diocese of Jefferson City;
 Renewing our Hope by Robert Barron, bishop of the Roman Catholic Diocese of Winona-Rochester;
The Light of Christ by Thomas Joseph White, O.P.;
 The Pope: His Mission and Task by Cardinal Gerhard Ludwig Müller
 The Virtues by John H. Garvey.

Journals
The Press publishes or distributes:

 The Catholic Historical Review, edited by Nelson Minnich, is the official publication of the American Catholic Historical Association;
 U.S. Catholic Historian
 International Journal for Evangelization and Catechetics
 The Jurist: Studies in Church Law and Ministry in conjunction with the Catholic University of America School of Canon Law;
 Nova et Vetera
 The Thomist: A Speculative Quarterly Review
 Bulletin of Medieval Canon Law
 Antiphon: A Journal for Liturgical Renewal (which is the official publication of the Society for Catholic Liturgy),
 Newman Studies Journal 
 Saint Anselm Journal
 Old Testament Abstracts, a publication of the Catholic Biblical Association
 Catholic Biblical Quarterly, a publication of the Catholic Biblical Association
 St. Nersess Theological Review
 Decisions of the Roman Rota

Many of these journals form part of the electronic database Project MUSE.

See also

 List of English-language book publishing companies
 List of university presses

References

External links 
 Catholic University of America Press

Press
University presses of the United States
Publishing companies established in 1939
1939 establishments in Washington, D.C.